General Rice may refer to:

Americus V. Rice (1835–1904), Union Army brigadier general 
Charles Rice (general) (1787–1863), Massachusetts Militia brigadier general
Desmond Rice (1924–2020), British Army major general
Edward A. Rice Jr. (born 1956), U.S. Air Force four-star general
Elliott Warren Rice (1835–1887), Union Army brigadier general and brevet major general
James Clay Rice (1828–1864), Union Army brigadier general of volunteers
L. Scott Rice (born 1958), U.S. Air Force lieutenant general
Spring R. Rice (1858–1929), British Army major general

See also
Attorney General Rice (disambiguation)